Never Can Say Goodbye is the debut album by Gloria Gaynor, released on MGM Records in January 1975. It is most notable for including several early Disco recordings. The album charted in the US Billboard at number 25 in the US Pop chart, and at number 21 in the US R&B chart. 
In the UK the album peaked at number 32, "Never Can Say Goodbye" was released in the UK as a single and reached number 2 in early 1975.

History
The album features three hit singles – "Honey Bee", "Never Can Say Goodbye", and "Reach Out, I'll Be There" – which are featured full-length on the album's first side in a 19-minute disco suite, then a famous first devised by Tom Moulton (not credited on the record itself). This album version of "Never Can Say Goodbye" features double drum beats during the  verse links, which is not heard in the single version. Gloria Gaynor also was involved in the songwriting of a number of the tracks, including "Real Good People".

The album was remastered and reissued with bonus tracks in 2010 by Big Break Records.

Track listing

Personnel
Gloria Gaynor – vocals
Lance Quinn, Jerry Freidman, Jeff Mironov – electric guitars
Bob Babbitt – bass
Pat Rebillot – electric piano
Carlos Martin – congas
Allan Schwartzberg – drums

Production
Meco Monardo – arrangers
Norman Harris – arrangers
Harold Wheeler – arrangers
Lou Del Gatto – arrangers
Tony Bongiovi – producer
 Meco Monardo – producer
Jay Ellis – producer
Paul Leka – producer
Tony Bongiovi – recording engineer
Bernie Block – cover photography
David Krieger – cover design
Bill Leby – art direction
Tom Moulton – mixing

Charts

Weekly charts

Year-end charts

Certifications and sales

References

External links
 

1975 debut albums
Gloria Gaynor albums
Albums produced by Tony Bongiovi
MGM Records albums